Theodore William John Schurch (5 May 1918 – 4 January 1946) was a British soldier who was executed under the Treachery Act 1940 after the end of the Second World War. He was the last person to be executed in Britain for an offence other than murder.

Early life
Schurch was born in Queen Charlotte's and Chelsea Hospital, Hammersmith, London, while his Swiss father was living in Britain. During his late teens, Schurch was a member of the British Union of Fascists.

In 1936, he enlisted in the British Army as a Royal Army Service Corps driver.

Double agent
In June 1942, Schurch was captured by Axis forces at Tobruk during the North African campaign. Soon afterwards, he began working for both Italian and German intelligence. He often posed as a prisoner of war to gain the trust of Allied prisoners, including Lieutenant Colonel Sir David Stirling, initiator of the Special Air Service.

Trial and execution
Schurch was arrested in Rome in March 1945, and charged with nine counts of treachery and one count of desertion. He was tried by court martial at the Duke of York's Headquarters in Chelsea, London, in September 1945, Major Melford Stevenson presiding. He was defended by Alexander Brands KC. During his court-martial, Schurch demanded to know the member of each judge. After learning that one of the officers was Jewish, he asked for him to be removed. The request was granted after Schurch's lawyer said "The question of fascism looms large in the accused’s mind, there would be an inevitable clash between the accused and the major." Schurch was nevertheless found guilty of all counts and received the death sentence mandated under law.	

Schurch was hanged on 4 January 1946 at HM Prison Pentonville, at the age of 27. His execution was carried out by Albert Pierrepoint, who had hanged William Joyce the previous day for treason.

Schurch was the only British soldier executed for treachery committed during the war. However, Duncan Scott-Ford, a merchant seaman, was also hanged for treachery, and New Zealand-born Captain Patrick Stanley Vaughan Heenan of the British Indian Army was convicted of espionage, and shot by a guard. Harold Cole, a British POW who betrayed members of the French Resistance, was shot dead by the French police in January 1946, a month after he escaped from custody.

Civilians William Joyce and John Amery were executed for high treason, a different offence.

References

Further reading

External links
 "Soldier Accused Of Aiding Enemy." Times, London, England, 13 September. 1945: 2. The Times Digital Archive. Web. 19 February. 2015.
 "Private Accused Of Treachery." Times, London, England, 18 September. 1945: 2. The Times Digital Archive. Web. 19 February. 2015.

1918 births
1946 deaths
Antisemitism in the United Kingdom
People from Hammersmith
Royal Army Service Corps soldiers
British Army personnel of World War II
British Army personnel who were court-martialled
Collaborators with Fascist Italy
Executed people from London
Executed British collaborators with Nazi Germany
English people of Swiss descent
Nazis executed by the British military by hanging
20th-century executions by England and Wales
English World War II spies for Germany
English fascists
People executed for spying for Nazi Germany